Sarah Ioannides (born 1972, in Canberra) is an Australian/British conductor, collaborator and multimedia producer living in the United States. She is currently music director of Symphony Tacoma and the founding artistic director of Cascade Conducting and Composing.

Early life and education 
Ioannides was born in Canberra, Australia and grew up in England. Her father, Ayis Ioannides, is a conductor and composer of Greek Cypriot ancestry. Her mother, Gwyneth Woollard, is of Scottish ancestry. Studying violin, piano and French horn from an early age, she entered Oxford University on an instrumental scholarship earning a Bachelor of Arts and Masters of Music degree from The Guildhall School of Music and Drama. She completed a Diploma in Conducting at the Curtis Institute of Music on a Fulbright scholarship and studied in St. Petersburg on a Presser Foundation Scholarship. She earned a Master of Music in conducting from the Juilliard School where she was assistant conductor to Otto-Werner Mueller.

Early career 
While at Oxford, Ioannides took her first position as Music Director at the age of 19 with Oxford Philharmonia and Music Director of Oxford University Opera leading the European premiere of Stephen Paulus’ The Woodlanders.

Serving as assistant conductor and productor coordinator to Tan Dun from 1999 to 2003, Ioannides was responsible for orchestra preparation, directing choirs, and coordinating productions on international tours with him. From 2002 to 2004, she was assistant conductor of the Cincinnati Symphony Orchestra and music director of the Cincinnati Symphony Youth Orchestra.

Music Director Positions 
From 2005 to 2011, Ioannides was music director of the El Paso Symphony Orchestra. During her tenure, she expanded the contemporary repertoire of the orchestra, directed and commissioned films for live orchestral multimedia performances.  

Ioannides also became music director of the Spartanburg Philharmonic Orchestra in 2005, serving in that position until 2017. During her time there, she focused on expanding the orchestra's partnerships with local school and arts organizations, School of the Deaf and the Blind, Ballet Spartanburg, and Spartanburg Day School, and launched a new chamber music series featuring the orchestra's principal players as well as co-commissioning a new percussion concerto by Australien composer Sean O’Boyle for Evelyn Glennie. 

In 2014, Symphony Tacoma announced the appointment of Ioannides as its next music director, with an initial contract of 5 years that was later extended through the 2023-2024 season. She has expanded Symphony Tacoma's repertoire with more diverse composers and guest artists and led new artistic and educational endeavors in the community. During the 2020-21 season, Ioannides developed extensive digital content, including the production of Symphony Tacoma's Encore Series, a curated selection of online performances founded on work from her previous six seasons with the orchestra.

In 2018, Ioannides became the founding artistic director of the Cascade Conducting Institute, a week-long international masterclass held in partnership with Symphony Tacoma. Since 2016, she has coached conductors and led new music performances for the Curtis Institute of Music. 

Ioannides has conducted orchestras, festivals and opera around the world, including Bilbao Symphony Orchestra, Royal Philharmonic Orchestra, Tonkünstler, Orchestre Nationale de Lyon, Daejeon Philharmonic, Metamorphosis Festival, Perth Festival, National Symphony of Colombia, Cincinnati and Seattle Symphony.

Advocacy 
Ioannides is an advocate for new music with a particular focus on collaborative projects and multimedia projects. She has conducted over forty world premieres, including works by Stephen Paulus, Marie Samuelsson, Hannah Lash, Richard Danielpour, Dario Marianelli, and Claudio Constantini. 

In her work with orchestras around the world, she is a spokesperson for more diverse composers and guest artists as well as supporting emerging women and minority conductors in her role as coach and mentor. 

Ioannides' work is also marked by her collaborations beyond the music industry. A notable example of such cross-sector projects is “Fire Mountain'' (2017),  a collaboration with the National Parks Association, Tacoma's Museum of Glass and Hilltop Artists. The piece was first presented in a double premiere with music by Daniel Ott and film by Derek Klein. 

In 2016, Ioannides produced a new multimedia art film to accompany Milhaud’s Creation du Monde, directed by Brad McCombs, using artworks selected from the Cincinnati Art Museum, international collections, and Ioannides’ own paintings. This film was also shown at Cincinnati's Summermusik Festival.

Recordings 
Ioannides's first commercial recording was released in 2008. She conducted violinist Lara St. John and the Royal Philharmonic Orchestra in works by John Corigliano, Matthew Hindson and Franz Liszt.  

In 2019, she recorded works by Marie Samuelsson including the Love Trilogy & Airborne Lines and Rumbles with Malmö Symphony and Nordic Chamber Orchestra.

As part of the 2021 Cascade Conducting program, Ioannides enabled six composers in the Pacific Northwest to have their works performed and recorded by Symphony Tacoma musicians and conducted by young international conductors.

Honors and awards 
Ioannides and her work have been recognized through a multitude of honors and awards, including: 

 2021 LAO Futures Fund supporting "Eternal Light"
 2020 NEA "Composer in the Community" with David Ludwig 
 2018 Women's Philharmonic Advocacy for Hannah Lash's "In Hopes of Finding the Sun" 
 2017 Delegate at the World Culture Summit in Abu Dhabi 
 Spartanburg County Proclamation “Sarah Ioannides Day”
 2016 NEA Daniel Ott's "Fire-Mountain" with Symphony Tacoma
 2016 Norman Lebrecht’s “Woman Conductors: The Power List”
 2016 Tacoma City Proclamation “Sarah Ioannides Day”
 NEA ArtWorks Spartanburg
 Women Conductors Grant from LAO
 National Endowment for the Arts Panelist for the U.S. Government
 Bruno Walter Assistant Conductor Chair by the Bruno Walter Foundation
 JoAnn Falletta Award for most promising female conductor 
 Leed Conducting Competition Kenneth Tyghe Memorial Prize/Audience Prize

Personal life 
Ioannides has been married to Scott Hartman, a trombonist and professor at Yale University, since 2005.  They have three children, a daughter, Audrey, and twins Elsa and Karl, born in 2008 and 2010. The family spent a decade splitting their time between three states while Ioannides was music director of El Paso Symphony, Spartanburg Philharmonic Orchestra and Symphony Tacoma.  Ioannides is a distance runner and has run several half marathons.  Ioannides is a descendant of the Maltese family and the eighth generation of violinists, composers and conductors, which includes composer Antonio Nani.

References

External links
 Official website of Sarah Ioannides
 Symphony Tacoma page on Sarah Ioannides
 Classical CD Review, June 2008, review of CD conducted by Ioannides

Living people
1972 births
Alumni of Somerville College, Oxford
Australian conductors (music)
Australian expatriates in the United States
Australian people of Greek Cypriot descent
Australian people of Scottish descent
British expatriates in the United States
British people of Australian descent
British people of Greek Cypriot descent
Curtis Institute of Music alumni
Juilliard School alumni
People from Canberra
Women conductors (music)
21st-century British conductors (music)
Australian expatriates in England